The 1996 Eisenberg Israel Open was a men's tennis tournament played on outdoor hard courts at the Israel Tennis Centers in the Tel Aviv District city of Ramat HaSharon, Israel and was part of the World Series of the 1996 ATP Tour. The tournament ran from October 14 through October 20, 1996. Fourth-seeded Javier Sánchez won the singles title.

Finals

Singles

 Javier Sánchez defeated  Marcos Ondruska 6–4, 7–5
 It was Sánchez's 2nd title of the year and the 24th of his career.

Doubles

 Marcos Ondruska /  Grant Stafford defeated  Noam Behr /  Eyal Erlich 6–3, 6–2
 It was Ondruska's 3rd title of the year and the 3rd of his career. It was Stafford's only title of the year and the 1st of his career.

References

Eisenberg Israel Open
Tel Aviv Open
Eisenberg Israel Open